Now That's What I Call Love is a compilation album in the U.S. Now! series, released on January 26, 2010, consisting of popular romantic ballads released between 1999 through 2009.

Track listing

Chart position

References

2010 compilation albums
Love